Shinhwa Broadcast is a South Korean variety television programme broadcast on general service cable channel JTBC. It is hosted by six-member boy band Shinhwa: Eric Mun, Lee Min-woo, Kim Dong-wan (up until April 2013), Shin Hye-sung, Jun Jin and Andy Lee (up until November 2013). The weekly programme premiered on 17 March 2012, and airs on Sundays at 23:00. The show went on hiatus after the 16 June 2013 broadcast and it returned on 3 November 2013 with a new format for season two. As of 8 December 2013, 65 episodes in two seasons have been broadcast.

History
Shinhwa Broadcast is part of Shinhwa's comeback to the entertainment industry in March 2012, after a four-year hiatus, during which band members served mandatory military service. The show is also the group's first exclusive variety programme. It is the first variety show that circles around a K-pop group, with the Shinhwa members as both the MCs and the members of the show. The show is produced by Yoon Hyun-jun, who previously worked on another jTBC programme, Girls’ Generation and the Dangerous Boys. The producers held a public shooting and press conference at the Jamsil Students' Gymnasium on 15 March to showcase the programme.

On the programme, leader Eric said "In order to differentiate ourselves from other K-pop groups and to make our strengths stand out, we made Shinhwa Broadcast. We've found a program that could go for a long run and met producers that we can trust". Jun Jin also commented that being in the show took them back to the time when they lived together and were really close to each other. He further added that the show "allows us to mentally let go of ourselves".

The show premiered on Saturday, 17 March 2012, at 22:00. In May, the programme changed its timeslot from 22:00 to 23:00. On 13 October, the show was given a new timeslot and changed format, from episode 33 on 28 October, it aired on Sundays at 19:40, where member received Private Tutorials on various topics.

It was announced on 24 February during the 49th episodes that the show is to go on hiatus while members concentrate on preparing for their 15th Anniversary Concert being held on 16 and 17 March at the Olympic Gymnastics Arena, and 11th studio album released in May 2013. It returned on 7 April with a new format of Mother’s Touch cooking competition. On 22 May 2013, jTBC announced that the show is to again go on hiatus from 16 June 2013 onwards, initially until September, whilst Shinhwa members are on tour in Asia for their 2013 Shinhwa Grand Tour: The Classic.

The show returned in November, after a hiatus of five months, for the second season of Small Legends Found By Shinhwa in a new time slot of 23:00. A new opening sequence for the show was filmed, and a behind-the-scene video was also released.

Format

Season one: Channels
Although Shinhwa Broadcasting does not have a resident MC, Jang Dong-hyuk sometimes guest hosts the show. In season one, each recording is usually divided and broadcast as two episodes in consecutive weeks.

Jun Jin was absent from the recording of episode 17, "School Channel: God of Classroom", broadcast on 7 July 2012. He was in a hospital, recovering from a microscopic nerve decompression surgery, which he had had to undergo because of chronic back pain.

Season one: Tutorials
The format for season two was studio based. Where each week experts on a specific topic were invited to give Shinhwa members private tutorials to learn the tricks of their trade, e.g. villainous acting, ballet, cheerleading. The episodes also started with a briefing by Shin Hye-sung, dubbed 'Shin Brief', on a topic related to the week's topic, e.g. members' acting experiences, drunken habits, ideal types. At the end of the episodes the experts chooses the best or most improved student.

On 16 December 2012, no episode was aired due to the presidential debates for the 2012 South Korean presidential election.

Season one: Mother’s Touch cooking competition 
Shinhwa members in a new concept for the show learn secret recipes and cooking techniques from mothers. Whose dishes were then judged alongside their teachers' as to which ones are the authentic dish with the real mother's touch. Kim Dong-wan was unable to join the group for the filming, due to filming commitments for daily drama Cheer Up, Mr. Kim! on Korean Broadcasting System. His leave of absence continue until after the drama ended its broadcast on 26 April 2013, until the show again went on hiatus in June 2013.

Season two: Small Legends
The new season is themed with Small Legends Found By Shinhwa, that aims to highlight and share stories of unsung heroes in the community. However member Kim Dong-wan confirmed his departure from the show, after having been absent for the Mother’s Touch cooking competition segment of season one. It was announced that Dong-wan wished to concentrate on his acting career.

List of episodes and guests

Guest Leo Kang of MasterChef Korea, who appeared in episode 46 to judge the 'newlywed cook-off' tournament, reportedly agreed to participate because he enjoys watching Shinhwa Broadcasting. Also members of girl group Girls' Generation admitted to be ingfans of the show, who begged their managers to arrange for them to be guests and the nine girls were in fierce competition for the six spots.

Reception
According to AGB Nielsen Media Research, the premiere episode achieved a nationwide rating of 0.336% and the subsequent episodes attained viewership of between 0.3% to 0.8%. Episode nine, however, showed an increase of 0.572% to 1.371% of viewership ratings, which was followed by placing first in viewership ratings with 1.312% for episode 13, the second episode with guest star Shinee, making the programme the most watched general service channel show that day.

Episodes 41 aired on 30 December 2012 with Eastern Philosophy professor Jo Kyu-moon as guest to read member's fortunes, ended 2012 with the programme's highest ratings to date. The episode recorded a nationwide rating of 1.881% with a by the minute peak of 2.994 percent.

Season one

Season two

International broadcast
 Mnet Japan - weekly broadcast, from December 2012

References

External links
  at JTBC 
 

Shinhwa
South Korean variety television shows
JTBC original programming
2012 South Korean television series debuts
Korean-language television shows
2014 South Korean television series endings
Television series by SM C&C